Portsmouth College is a sixth form college on Tangier Road, Baffins, in the city of Portsmouth, England.

Admissions
The principal at Portsmouth College is Simon Barrable. The college is located just off the Eastern Road which provides an easy way to get to the college from inside and outside the city. This is near the A2030 east of Baffins, south of Great Salterns lake and golf course. It is one of two post-16 colleges in Portsmouth, the other being Highbury College. Comprehensive schools in Portsmouth do not have sixth forms.

History
The site of what is now Portsmouth College started out as marsh land on the edge of Portsmouth and was reclaimed in 1705.  One name for the area, Salterns, reflects its past use for salt pans, evaporating sea water to make salt.

In November 1888 Portsmouth Higher Grade School was formed. It was later to become a boys' grammar school before becoming a comprehensive and then becoming a college.

Grammar school
It became the Southern Grammar School for Boys after moving from Highland Road in 1956.

Comprehensive school
Great Salterns Secondary School was formed in 1975, a coeducational comprehensive school

Sixth form college
In 1984 secondary education in Portsmouth was reorganised. All the existing comprehensive schools lost their sixth forms, which were combined into a new sixth form college in the buildings previously belonging to Great Salterns School.

Portsmouth College provides a variety of courses from GCSEs, A – Levels, and BTECs in a wide range of subjects. The college has a new Computing and Library facility which has got a high speed network with Internet connections. There are a wide range of computer facilities available to students.

The college has a good drama section which has its own studio theatre which has sound and light systems, along with a full sized dance studio with mirrors.
The college provides education for anyone of any age and there are many subjects taught at the college including Physics, Art, Graphic Design, Chemistry, Sport, Biology, Geography, Leisure, Travel and Tourism, Drama, Dance, Performing Arts and many others.

Former teachers
 Anthony Tuckwell, Headmaster from 1984–99 of King Edward VI Grammar School (taught history from 1966–9 at the boys' school)

Academic results
The College has just won the 2009 Beacon Award by the AoC for the College School Partnerships.  It gets A-level results under the England average.

The most recent Ofsted inspection graded the college as 'satisfactory' and noted that "success rates are rising but they are still below national averages for sixth form colleges".

Alumni

Southern Grammar School for Boys
 Prof James Barber, Ernst Chain Professor of Biochemistry since 1989 at Imperial College London
 Raymond Blackman MBE, Editor from the 1949–50 until the 1972–3 edition of Jane's Fighting Ships
 Robert Brash, Ambassador to Indonesia from 1984–88
 Prof George Butterworth, Professor of Psychology from 1991–2000 at the University of Sussex, and Editor from 1988–94 of the British Journal of Developmental Psychology
 Donald Davies CBE, computing pioneer, who invented packet switching, a central foundation of the architecture of Transmission Control Protocol (TCP), at the National Physical Laboratory in the late 1960s
 Roy Koerner (Fritz) MBE, PhD Scientist and explorer (with Wally Herbert) and glaciologist, worked with the Polar Continental Shelf Project, and of worldwide importance for his 'ice core' data (oxygen isotope ratio cycle) that dated back over 11,000 years, to show summer-melt layers with relevant carbon dioxide content in the air. Ice thickness Data gathered during PolaR expeditions is still used as calibration for global warming survey
 Christopher le Brun, painter
 Prof David Marks, Professor of Psychology from 2000–10 at City University London
 Ian Mikardo, Labour MP from 1945–87
 Alan Pascoe MBE, 400m hurdler
 Rear-Adm David Sherval CB
 Derek Shulman, musician with Simon Dupree and the Big Sound
 General Sir John Stibbon OBE, Chief Royal Engineer from 1993–9
 Keith Thomas CB OBE, chief executive from 1979–83 of Royal Navy Dockyards and of the Royal Corps of Naval Constructors

Portsmouth College
 Leadley, singer-songwriter, présenter, and YouTuber
 Stephen Morgan, Labour MP
 Alexander Evans (diplomat), former Deputy and Acting High Commissioner to India

References

External links
 Portsmouth College website
 Former school
 Aerial photograph

Sixth form colleges in Hampshire
Education in Portsmouth
People educated at Portsmouth College